Jacinda Kate Laurell Ardern (born 26 July 1980) is a New Zealand politician who served as the 40th prime minister of New Zealand and leader of the Labour Party from 2017 to 2023. A member of the Labour Party, she has been the member of Parliament (MP) for Mount Albert since 2017. 

Born in Hamilton, Ardern grew up in Morrinsville and Murupara. She joined the Labour Party at the age of 17. After graduating from the University of Waikato in 2001, Ardern worked as a researcher in the office of Prime Minister Helen Clark. She later worked in London as an adviser in the Cabinet Office during Tony Blair's premiership. In 2008, Ardern was elected president of the International Union of Socialist Youth. Ardern was first elected as an MP in the 2008 general election, when Labour lost power after nine years. She was later elected to represent the Mount Albert electorate in a by-election on 25 February 2017.

Ardern was unanimously elected as deputy leader of the Labour Party on 1 March 2017, after the resignation of Annette King. Exactly five months later, with an election due, Labour's leader Andrew Little resigned after a historically low opinion polling result for the party, with Ardern elected unopposed as leader in his place. Labour's support increased rapidly after Ardern became leader, and she led her party to gain 14 seats at the 2017 general election on 23 September, winning 46 seats to the National Party's 56. After negotiations, New Zealand First chose to enter a minority coalition government with Labour, supported by the Green Party, with Ardern as prime minister. She was sworn in by the governor-general on 26 October 2017. She became the world's youngest female head of government at age 37. Ardern gave birth to her daughter on 21 June 2018, making her the world's second elected head of government to give birth while in office (after Benazir Bhutto).

Ardern describes herself as a social democrat and a progressive. The Sixth Labour Government has faced challenges from the New Zealand housing crisis, child poverty, and social inequality. In March 2019, in the aftermath of the Christchurch mosque shootings, Ardern reacted by rapidly introducing strict gun laws, winning her wide recognition. Throughout 2020 she led New Zealand's response to the COVID-19 pandemic, for which she won praise for New Zealand being one of the few Western nations to successfully contain the virus. It is estimated that her government's actions saved as many as 80,000 lives. Ardern moved the Labour Party further to the centre towards the October 2020 general election, promising to cut spending during the remainder of the COVID-19 recession. She led the Labour Party to a landslide victory, gaining an overall majority of 65 seats in Parliament, the first time a majority government had been formed since the introduction of a proportional representation system in 1996.

On 19 January 2023, Ardern announced she would resign as Labour leader, prompting global reactions about her leadership style and policy decisions. Following the unopposed election of Chris Hipkins as her successor, she resigned as leader of the Labour Party on 22 January and submitted her resignation as prime minister to the governor-general on 25 January.

Early life and education
Ardern was born on 26 July 1980 in Hamilton, New Zealand. She grew up in Morrinsville and Murupara, where her father, Ross Ardern, worked as a police officer, and her mother, Laurell Ardern, worked as a school catering assistant. Ardern was raised in the Church of Jesus Christ of Latter-day Saints (LDS Church), and her uncle Ian S. Ardern is a general authority in the church. She studied at Morrinsville College, where she was the student representative on the school's board of trustees. Whilst still at school she found her first job, working at a local fish-and-chip shop.

She joined the Labour Party at the age of 17. Her aunt, Marie Ardern, a longstanding member of the Labour Party, recruited the teenaged Ardern to help her with campaigning for New Plymouth MP Harry Duynhoven during his re-election campaign at the 1999 general election.

Ardern attended the University of Waikato, graduating in 2001 with a Bachelor of Communication Studies in politics and public relations, a specialist three-year degree. She took a semester abroad at Arizona State University in 2001. After graduating from university, she spent time working in the offices of Phil Goff and of Helen Clark as a researcher. After a period of time in New York City, United States, where she volunteered at a soup kitchen and worked on a workers' rights campaign, Ardern moved to London, England, in 2006, where she became a senior policy adviser in an 80-person policy unit of the United Kingdom Cabinet Office under prime minister Tony Blair. (She did not meet Blair in person while in London, but later at an event in New Zealand in 2011 she questioned him about the 2003 invasion of Iraq.) Ardern was also seconded to the United Kingdom Home Office to help with a review of policing in England and Wales.

Early political career

President of International Union of Socialist Youth 
On 30 January 2008, at 27, Ardern was elected president of the International Union of Socialist Youth (IUSY) at their world congress in the Dominican Republic for a two-year term until 2010. The role saw her spend time in several countries, including Hungary, Jordan, Israel, Algeria and China. It was mid-way through her presidency term that Ardern became a list MP for the Labour Party. She then continued to manage both roles for the next 15 months.

Member of Parliament 

Ahead of the 2008 election, Ardern was ranked 20th on Labour's party list. This was a very high placement for someone who was not already a sitting MP, and virtually assured her of a seat in Parliament. Accordingly, Ardern returned from London to campaign full-time. She also became Labour's candidate for the safe National electorate of Waikato. Ardern was unsuccessful in the electorate vote, but her high placement on Labour's party list allowed her to enter Parliament as a list MP. Upon election, she became the youngest sitting MP in Parliament, succeeding fellow Labour MP Darren Hughes, and remained the youngest MP until the election of Gareth Hughes on 11 February 2010.

Opposition leader Phil Goff promoted Ardern to the front bench, naming her Labour's spokesperson for Youth Affairs and as associate spokesperson for Justice (Youth Affairs).

She made regular appearances on TVNZ's Breakfast programme as part of the "Young Guns" feature, in which she appeared alongside National MP (and future National leader) Simon Bridges.

She lost to Kaye by 717 votes. However, she returned to Parliament via the party list, on which she was ranked 13th. Ardern maintained an office within the electorate while she was a list MP based in Auckland Central.

After Goff resigned from the Party leadership following his defeat at the 2011 election, Ardern supported David Shearer over David Cunliffe. She was elevated to the fourth-ranking position in his Shadow Cabinet on 19 December 2011, becoming a spokesperson for social development under the new leader.

Ardern stood again in Auckland Central at the 2014 general election. She again finished second though increased her own vote and reduced Kaye's majority from 717 to 600. Ranked 5th on Labour's list, Ardern was still returned to Parliament where she became Shadow spokesperson for Justice, Children, Small Business, and Arts & Culture under new leader Andrew Little.

In 2014 Ardern was also selected, attended and graduated from the World Economic Forum's (WEF) Forum of Young Global Leaders, founded by Klaus Schwab, which takes place in Switzerland. She remains involved publicly as a part of the Young Global Leaders Alumni Community, and speaks at WEF events.

Mount Albert by-election 

Ardern put forward her name for the Labour nomination for the Mount Albert by-election to be held in February 2017 following the resignation of David Shearer on 8 December 2016. When nominations for the Labour Party closed on 12 January 2017, Ardern was the only nominee and was selected unopposed. On 21 January, Ardern participated in the 2017 Women's March, a worldwide protest in opposition to Donald Trump, the newly inaugurated president of the United States. She was confirmed as Labour's candidate at a meeting on 22 January. Ardern won a landslide victory, gaining 77 per cent of votes cast in the preliminary results.

Deputy Leader of the Labour Party 
Following her win in the by-election, Ardern was unanimously elected as deputy leader of the Labour Party on 7 March 2017, following the resignation of Annette King, who was intending to retire at the next election. Ardern's vacant list seat was taken by Raymond Huo.

Leader of the Opposition 

On 1 August 2017, just seven weeks before the 2017 general election, Ardern assumed the position of leader of the Labour Party, and consequently became leader of the Opposition, following the resignation of Andrew Little. Little stood down due to the party's historically low polling. Ardern was unanimously confirmed in an election to choose a new leader at a caucus meeting the same day. At 37, Ardern became the youngest leader of the Labour Party in its history. She is also the second female leader of the party after Helen Clark. According to Ardern, Little had previously approached her on 26 July and said he thought she should take over as Labour leader then, as he was of the opinion he could not turn things around for the party, although Ardern declined and told him to "stick it out".

At her first press conference after her election as leader, she said that the forthcoming election campaign would be one of "relentless positivity". Immediately following her appointment, the party was inundated with donations by the public, reaching NZ$700 per minute at its peak. After Ardern's ascension to the leadership, Labour rose dramatically in opinion polls. By late August, the party had reached 43 per cent in the Colmar Brunton poll (having been 24 per cent under Little's leadership) as well as managing to overtake National in opinion polls for the first time in over a decade. Detractors observed her positions were substantially similar to those of Andrew Little, and suggested that Labour's sudden increase in popularity were due to her youth and good looks.

In mid-August, Ardern stated that a Labour government would establish a tax working group to explore the possibility of introducing a capital gains tax but ruled out taxing family homes. In response to negative publicity, Ardern abandoned plans to introduce a capital gains tax during the first term of a Labour government. Finance spokesperson Grant Robertson later clarified that Labour would not introduce new taxes until after the 2020 election. The policy shift accompanied strident allegations by Minister of Finance Steven Joyce that Labour had an $11.7 billion "hole" in its tax policy.

The Labour and Green parties' proposed water and pollution taxes also generated criticism from farmers. On 18 September 2017, the farming lobby group Federated Farmers staged a protest against the taxes in Ardern's hometown of Morrinsville. New Zealand First leader Winston Peters attended the protest to campaign but was jeered at by the farmers because they suspected he was also in favour of the taxes. During the protest, one farmer displayed a sign calling Ardern a "pretty communist". This was criticised as misogynistic by former prime minister Helen Clark.

In the final days of the general election campaign, the opinion polls narrowed with National taking a slight lead.

2017 general election 

During the general election held on 23 September 2017, Ardern retained her Mount Albert electorate seat by a margin of 15,264 votes. Labour increased its vote share to 36.89 per cent while National dropped back to 44.45. Labour gained 14 seats, increasing its parliamentary representation to 46 seats, the best result for the party since losing power in 2008.

The rival Labour and National parties lacked sufficient seats to govern alone and held talks with the Greens and New Zealand First parties about forming a coalition. Under the country's mixed-member proportional (MMP) voting system, New Zealand First held the balance of power and chose to be part of a coalition government with Labour.

Prime minister (2017–2023)

First term (2017–2020)

On 19 October 2017, New Zealand First leader Winston Peters agreed to form a coalition with Labour, making Ardern the next prime minister. This coalition received confidence and supply from the Green Party. Ardern named Peters as deputy prime minister and Minister of Foreign Affairs. She also gave New Zealand First five posts in her government, with Peters and three other ministers serving in Cabinet. The next day, Ardern confirmed that she would hold the ministerial portfolios of National Security and Intelligence; Arts, Culture and Heritage; and Vulnerable Children; reflecting the shadow positions she held as Leader of the Opposition. Her position as Minister for Vulnerable Children was later replaced with the role of Minister for Child Poverty Reduction, while New Zealand First MP Tracey Martin took on the role of Minister for Children. She was officially sworn in by Governor-General Dame Patsy Reddy on 26 October, alongside her ministry. Upon taking office, Ardern said that her government would be "focused, empathetic and strong".

Ardern is New Zealand's third female prime minister after Jenny Shipley (1997–1999) and Helen Clark (1999–2008). She is a member of the Council of Women World Leaders. Entering office aged 37, Ardern is also the youngest individual to become New Zealand's head of government since Edward Stafford, who became premier in 1856 also aged 37. On 19 January 2018, Ardern announced that she was pregnant, and that Winston Peters would take the role of acting prime minister for six weeks after the birth. Following the birth of a daughter, she took her maternity leave from 21 June to 2 August 2018.

Domestic affairs

Ardern promised to halve child poverty in New Zealand within a decade. In July 2018, Ardern announced the start of her government's flagship Families Package. Among its provisions, the package gradually increased paid parental leave to 26 weeks and introduced a $60 per-week universal BestStart Payment for low and middle-income families with young children. The Family Tax Credit, Orphans Benefit, Accommodation Supplement, and Foster Care Allowance were all substantially increased as well. In 2019, the government began the roll-out of a school lunches pilot programme to assist in reducing child poverty numbers; this was then extended to support 200,000 children (about 25 per cent of school rolls) in low decile schools. Other efforts to reduce poverty have included increases to main welfare benefits, expanding free doctor's visits, providing free menstrual hygiene products in schools and adding to state housing stock.

However, as of 2022 critics say rising housing costs are continuing to cripple families and systemic changes are needed to ensure any gains are lasting.

Economically, Ardern's government has implemented steady increases to the country's minimum wage and introduced the Provincial Growth Fund to invest in rural infrastructure projects. The National Party's planned tax cuts were cancelled, saying instead it would prioritise expenditure on healthcare and education. The first year of post-secondary education was made free from 1 January 2018 and, after industrial action, the government agreed to increase primary teachers' pay by 12.8 (for beginning teachers) and 18.5 per cent (for senior teachers without other responsibilities) by 2021.

Despite the Labour Party campaigning on a capital gains tax for the last three elections, Ardern pledged in April 2019 that the government would not implement a capital gains tax under her leadership. However, since then the period for which capital gain on rental properties sold is taxed has increased from five to ten years since purchase.

Ardern travelled to Waitangi in 2018 for the annual Waitangi Day commemoration; stayed in Waitangi for five days, an unprecedented length. Ardern became the first female prime minister to speak from the top marae. Her visit was largely well-received by Māori leaders, with commentators noting a sharp contrast with the acrimonious responses received by several of her predecessors.

On 24 August 2018, Ardern removed Broadcasting Minister Clare Curran from Cabinet after she failed to disclose a meeting with a broadcaster outside of parliamentary business, which was judged to be a conflict of interest. Curran remained a minister outside Cabinet, and Ardern was criticised by the Opposition for not dismissing Curran from her portfolio. Ardern later accepted Curran's resignation. In 2019, she was criticised for her handling of an allegation of sexual assault against a Labour Party staffer. Ardern said she had been told the allegation did not involve sexual assault or violence before a report about the incident was published in The Spinoff. Media questioned her account, with one journalist stating that Ardern's claim was "hard to swallow".

Ardern opposes criminalising people who use cannabis in New Zealand, and pledged to hold a referendum on the issue. A non-binding referendum to legalise cannabis was held in conjunction with the 2020 general election on 17 October 2020. Ardern admitted to past cannabis use during a televised debate prior to the election. In the referendum, voters rejected the proposed Cannabis Legalisation and Control Bill by 51.17 per cent. A retrospective article published in a medical journal suggested that Ardern's refusal to publicly back the 'yes' campaign "may have been a decisive factor in the narrow defeat".

In September 2020, Ardern announced that the government had abandoned plans to make tertiary education tuition-free.

Foreign affairs

On 5 November 2017, Ardern made her first official overseas trip to Australia, where she met Australian Prime Minister Malcolm Turnbull for the first time. Relations between the two countries had been strained in the preceding months because of Australia's treatment of New Zealanders living in the country, and shortly before taking office, Ardern had spoken of the need to rectify this situation, and to develop a better working relationship with the Australian government. Turnbull described the meeting in cordial terms: "we trust each other...The fact we are from different political traditions is irrelevant". In 2020, Ardern criticised Australia's policy of deporting New Zealanders, many of whom had lived in Australia but had not taken up Australian citizenship, as "corrosive" and damaging to Australia–New Zealand relations.

Ardern attended the 2017 APEC summit in Vietnam, the Commonwealth Heads of Government Meeting 2018 in London (featuring a private audience with Queen Elizabeth II) and a United Nations summit in New York City. After her first formal meeting with Donald Trump she reported that the US President showed "interest" in New Zealand's gun buyback programme. In 2018, Ardern raised the issue of Xinjiang internment camps and human-rights abuses against the Uyghur Muslim minority in China. Ardern has also raised concerns over the persecution of the Rohingya Muslims in Myanmar.

Ardern travelled to Nauru, where she attended the 2018 Pacific Islands Forum. Media and political opponents criticised her decision to travel separately from the rest of her contingent, costing taxpayers up to NZ$100,000, so that she could spend more time with her daughter. At a 2018 United Nations General Assembly meeting, Ardern became the first female head of government to attend with her infant present. Her address to the General Assembly praised the United Nations for its multilateralism, expressed support for the world's youth, called for immediate attention to the effects and causes of climate change, for the equality of women, and for kindness as the basis for action.

Trade and Export Growth Minister David Parker and Ardern announced that the government would continue participating in the Trans-Pacific Partnership negotiations despite opposition from the Green Party. New Zealand ratified the revised agreement, the Comprehensive and Progressive Agreement for Trans-Pacific Partnership, which she described as being better than the original TPP agreement.

Christchurch mosque shootings

On 15 March 2019, 51 people were fatally shot and 49 injured in two mosques in Christchurch. In a statement broadcast on television, Ardern offered condolences and stated that the shootings had been carried out by suspects with "extremist views" that have no place in New Zealand, or anywhere else in the world. She also described it as a well-planned terrorist attack.

Announcing a period of national mourning, Ardern was the first signatory of a national condolence book that she opened in the capital, Wellington. She also travelled to Christchurch to meet first responders and families of the victims. In an address at the Parliament, she declared she would never say the name of the attacker: "Speak the names of those who were lost rather than the name of the man who took them ... he will, when I speak, be nameless." Ardern received international praise for her response to the shootings, and a photograph of her hugging a member of the Christchurch Muslim community with the word "peace" in English and Arabic was projected onto the Burj Khalifa, the world's tallest building. A  mural of this photograph was unveiled in May 2019.

In response to the shootings, Ardern announced her government's intention to introduce stronger firearms regulations. She said that the attack had exposed a range of weaknesses in New Zealand's gun law. Less than one month after the attack, the New Zealand Parliament passed a law that bans most semiautomatic weapons and assault rifles, parts that convert guns into semiautomatic guns, and higher capacity magazines. Ardern and French President Emmanuel Macron co-chaired the 2019 Christchurch Call summit, which aimed to "bring together countries and tech companies in an attempt to bring to an end the ability to use social media to organise and promote terrorism and violent extremism".

COVID-19 pandemic
On 14 March 2020, Ardern announced in response to the COVID-19 pandemic in New Zealand that the government would be requiring anyone entering the country from midnight 15 March to isolate themselves for 14 days. She said the new rules will mean New Zealand has the "widest ranging and toughest border restrictions of any country in the world". On 19 March, Ardern stated that New Zealand's borders would be closed to all non-citizens and non-permanent residents, after 11:59 pm on 20 March (NZDT). Ardern announced that New Zealand would move to alert level 4, including a nationwide lockdown, at 11:59 pm on 25 March.

National and international media covered the government response led by Ardern, praising her leadership and swift response to the outbreak in New Zealand. The Washington Post Fifield described her regular use of interviews, press conferences and social media as a "masterclass in crisis communication". Alastair Campbell, a journalist and adviser in Tony Blair's British government, commended Ardern for addressing both the human and economic consequences of the coronavirus pandemic.

In mid-April 2020, two applicants filed a lawsuit at the Auckland High Court against Ardern and several government officials including Director-General of Health Ashley Bloomfield, claiming that the lockdown imposed as a result of the COVID-19 pandemic infringed on their freedoms and was made for "political gain". The lawsuit was dismissed by Justice Mary Peters of the Auckland High Court.

On 5 May 2020, Ardern, her Australian counterpart Scott Morrison and several Australian state and territorial leaders agreed that they would collaborate to develop a trans-Tasman COVID-safe travel zone that would allow residents from both countries to travel freely without travel restrictions as part of efforts to ease coronavirus restrictions.

Post-lockdown opinion polls showed the Labour Party with nearly 60 per cent support. In May 2020, Ardern rated 59.5 per cent as 'preferred prime minister' in a Newshub-Reid Research poll—the highest score for any leader in the Reid Research poll's history. The number of lives saved by the response Ardern spearheaded was estimated as up to 80,000 by a team led by Shaun Hendy.

Second term (2020–2023)

In the 2020 general election, Ardern led her party to a landslide victory, winning an overall majority of 65 seats in the 120-seat House of Representatives, and 50 per cent of the nationwide party vote (moreover Labour won the party vote in 71 out of the 72 electorates). She also retained the Mount Albert electorate by a margin of 21,246 votes. Ardern credited her victory to her government's response to the COVID-19 pandemic and the economic impacts it has had.

Domestic affairs
On 2 December 2020, Ardern declared a climate change emergency in New Zealand and pledged that the Government would be carbon neutral by 2025 in a parliamentary motion. As part of this commitment towards carbon neutrality, the public sector will be required to buy only electric or hybrid vehicles, the fleet will be reduced over time by 20 per cent, and all 200 coal-fired boilers in public service buildings will be phased out. This motion was supported by the Labour, Green, and Māori parties but was opposed by the opposition National and ACT parties. However, climate activist Greta Thunberg said about Jacinda Ardern: "It's funny that people believe Jacinda Ardern and people like that are climate leaders. That just tells you how little people know about the climate crisis ... the emissions haven't fallen."

In response to worsening housing affordability issues, Minister of Housing and Urban Development Megan Woods announced new reforms. These reforms included the removal of the interest rate tax-deduction, lifting Housing Aid for first home buyers, renewed allocation of infrastructure funds (named Housing Acceleration Fund) for district councils, an extension of the Bright Line Test from five to ten years.

On 14 June 2021, Ardern confirmed that the New Zealand Government would formally apologise for the Dawn Raids at the Auckland Town Hall on 26 June 2021. The Dawn Raids were a series of police raids which disproportionately targeted members of the Pasifika diaspora in New Zealand during the 1970s and early 1980s.

In September 2022, Ardern led the nation's tributes following the death of New Zealand's longest-reigning monarch, Queen Elizabeth II. Ardern described her as an "incredible woman", and a "constant in our lives". She also described the Queen as a "much admired and respected" monarch. Ardern also stated that republicanism was currently not on the agenda but believed that the country would head in that direction in the future.

In mid December 2022, Ardern was recorded on a hot mic calling the leader of the ACT Party, David Seymour, an "arrogant prick" during Parliament's Question Time. Since New Zealand parliamentary debates are televised, the comment was aired on television during Question Time. Ardern later texted Seymour to apologise for her comment. The two politicians subsequently reconciled and joined forces to raise NZ$60,000 for the Prostate Cancer Foundation by auctioning a signed and framed copy of the Prime Minister's remark.

COVID-19 and vaccination programme
On 17 June 2020, Prime Minister Ardern met with Bill Gates and Melinda Gates via a teleconference in a meeting requested by Bill Gates. In the meeting, Ardern was asked by Melinda Gates to "speak up" in support of a collective approach to a COVID-19 vaccine. Ardern said she'd be happy to assist, an Official Information Act request response has shown. A month earlier in May, Ardern's Government had pledged $37 million to help find a COVID-19 vaccine, which included $15 million to CEPI (Coalition for Epidemic Preparedness Innovations) founded by the Bill and Melinda Gates Foundation and the World Economic Forum among others, and $7 million to GAVI (Global Alliance for Vaccines and Immunisation), also founded by the Bill and Melinda Gates Foundation. During the meeting Gates noted this contribution. Ardern had also met the Gateses the year before in New York.

On 12 December 2020, Ardern and Cook Islands Prime Minister Mark Brown announced that a travel bubble between New Zealand and the Cook Islands would be established in 2021, allowing two-way quarantine-free travel between the two countries. On 14 December, Prime Minister Ardern confirmed that the New Zealand and Australian Governments had agreed to establish a travel bubble between the two countries the following year. On 17 December, Ardern also announced that the Government had purchased two more vaccines from the pharmaceutical companies AstraZeneca and Novavax for New Zealand and its Pacific partners in addition to the existing stocks from Pfizer/BioNTech and Janssen Pharmaceutica.

On 26 January 2021, Ardern stated that New Zealand's borders would remain closed to most non-citizens and non-residents until New Zealand citizens have been "vaccinated and protected". The COVID-19 vaccination programme began in February 2021. An outbreak of the SARS-CoV-2 Delta variant in August 2021 prompted the government to enact a nationwide lockdown again. By September, the number of new community infections began to fall again; comparisons were made with an outbreak in neighbouring Australia, which was unable to contain a Delta variant outbreak at the same time.

On 29 January 2022, Ardern entered into self-isolation after she was identified as a close contact of a COVID-19 case on an Air New Zealand flight from Kerikeri to Auckland on 22 January. In addition Governor-General Cindy Kiro and chief press secretary Andrew Campbell, who were aboard the same flight, also went into self-isolation.

On 14 May 2022, Ardern tested positive for COVID-19. Her partner Gayford had tested positive for COVID-19 several days earlier on 8 May.

Foreign affairs

In early December 2020, Ardern expressed support for Australia during a dispute between Canberra and Beijing over Chinese Foreign Ministry official Zhao Lijian's Twitter post alleging that Australia had committed war crimes against Afghans. She described the image as not being factual and incorrect, adding that the New Zealand Government would raise its concerns with the Chinese Government.

On 9 December 2020, Ardern delivered a speech virtually at the Singapore FinTech Festival, applauding the Digital Economy Partnership Agreement (DEPA) among New Zealand, Chile and Singapore as "the first important steps" to achieve the regulatory alignment to facilitate businesses.

On 16 February 2021, Ardern criticised the Australian Government's decision to revoke dual New Zealand–Australian national Suhayra Aden's Australian citizenship. Aden had migrated from New Zealand to Australia at the age of six and acquired Australian citizenship. She subsequently travelled to Syria to live in the Islamic State as a ISIS bride in 2014. On 15 February 2021, Aden and two of her children were detained by Turkish authorities for illegal entry. Ardern accused the Australian Government of abandoning its obligations to its citizens and also offered consular support to Aden and her children. In response, Australian Prime Minister Scott Morrison defended the decision to revoke Aden's citizenship, citing legislation stripping dual nationals of their Australian citizenship if they were engaged in terrorist activities. Following a phone conversation, the two leaders agreed to work together to address what Ardern described as "quite a complex legal situation".

In response to the 2021 Israel–Palestine crisis, Ardern stated on 17 May that New Zealand "condemned both the indiscriminate rocket fire we have seen from Hamas and what looks to be a response that has gone well beyond self-defence on both sides." She also stated that Israel had the "right to exist" but Palestinians also had a "right to a peaceful home, a secure home."

In late May 2021, Ardern hosted Australian Prime Minister Scott Morrison during a state visit at Queenstown. The two heads of governments issued a joint statement affirming bilateral cooperation on the issues of COVID-19, bilateral relations, and security issues in the Indo-Pacific. Ardern and Morrison also raised concerns about the South China Sea dispute and human rights in Hong Kong and Xinjiang. In response to the joint statement, Chinese Foreign Ministry spokesperson Wang Wenbin criticised the Australian and New Zealand governments for interfering in Chinese domestic affairs.

In early December 2021, Ardern participated in the virtual Summit for Democracy that was hosted by US President Joe Biden. In her address, she talked about bolstering democratic resilience in the age of COVID-19 followed by panel discussions. Ardern also announced that New Zealand would contribute an additional NZ$1 million to supporting Pacific countries' anti-corruption efforts, as well as contributing to UNESCO's Global Media Defence Fund and the International Fund for Public Interest Media.

In April 2022, Ardern was banned from entering Russia along with 129 other parliamentarians and senior government officials after the New Zealand Parliament unanimously imposed sanctions on Russia in response to its invasion of Ukraine.

In late May 2022, Ardern led a trade and tourism mission to the United States. During her trip, she urged the Biden Administration to join the Comprehensive and Progressive Agreement for Trans-Pacific Partnership (CPTPP); the successor to the Trans-Pacific Partnership Agreement which the previous Trump Administration had abandoned in 2017. While attending the Late Show with Stephen Colbert, Ardern also condemned the Robb Elementary School shooting and advocated stronger gun control measures, citing New Zealand's ban on semi-automatic firearms following the 2019 Christchurch mosque shootings. On 27 May, Ardern gave the annual commencement address at Harvard University, speaking about gun reform and democracy. She was also awarded an honorary doctorate in law. On 28 May, Ardern signed a memorandum of understanding with Governor of California Gavin Newsom formalising bilateral cooperation between New Zealand and California in climate change mitigation and research.

On 1 June 2022, Ardern met with US President Joe Biden and Vice-President Kamala Harris to reaffirm bilateral relations between the two countries. The two leaders also issued a joint statement reaffirming bilateral cooperation on various issues including the South China Sea dispute, support for Ukraine in response to the Russian invasion, Chinese tensions with Taiwan, and alleged human-rights violations in Xinjiang and Hong Kong. In response, Chinese Foreign Ministry official Zhao Lijian accused New Zealand and the United States of seeking to spread disinformation about China's engagement with Pacific Islands countries, interfering in Chinese internal affairs, and urged New Zealand to adhere to its stated "independent foreign policy".

On 10 June 2022, Ardern visited the newly elected Australian Prime Minister Anthony Albanese. The two leaders discussed a range of issues including Australia's controversial Section 501 deportation policy, Chinese influence in the Pacific region, climate change, and working with Pacific neighbours. In response to Ardern's concerns, Albanese stated that he would explore ways of addressing New Zealand's concerns about the adverse impact of its deportation policies on New Zealanders residing in Australia.

In late June 2022, Ardern attended the NATO's Leader Summit, which marked the first time that New Zealand had formally addressed a NATO event. During her speech, she emphasised New Zealand's commitment to peace and human rights. Ardern also criticised China for challenging international norms and rules in the South Pacific. She also alleged that Russia was conducting a disinformation campaign targeting New Zealand due to its support for Ukraine. In response, the Chinese Embassy defended China's engagement with the South Pacific region, claiming that China was only interested in promoting regional development and did not seek to militarise the region.

On 30 June 2022, Ardern spoke by telephone with Ukrainian President Volodymyr Zelensky. Though Zelensky had earlier invited Ardern to visit Ukraine during her European trade mission, Ardern had declined due to scheduling issues. During the conversation, Ardern reassured Zelensky that New Zealand would continue imposing sanctions on Russia. Zelensky also thanked New Zealand for providing aid to Ukraine and called for assistance in rebuilding Ukraine.

In early August 2022, Ardern led a delegation of New Zealand political leaders, officials, civil society leaders, and journalists including National Party and opposition leader Christopher Luxon, Arts, Culture and Heritage Minister Carmel Sepuloni and Pacific Peoples Minister William Sio on a state visit to Samoa to marked the 60th anniversary of Samoa's independence. This visit preceded an earlier visit to New Zealand in June 2022 by Samoan Prime Minister Fiame Naomi Mata'afa. On 2 August, Ardern met with Fiame to discuss issues of concern to bilateral relations including climate change, economic resilience, COVID-19, health and Samoan seasonal workers in New Zealand. Ardern also confirmed that New Zealand would commit NZ$15 million in aid to support Samoa's climate change mitigation efforts and NZ$12m to rebuild Apia's historical Savalalo Market.

In September 2022, Ardern along with her fiance Clarke Gayford and their daughter Neve attended Queen Elizabeth II's funeral. During the funeral, she wore a traditional Māori cloak designed by Māori fashion designer Kiri Nathan.

In late October 2022, Ardern and Gayford visited New Zealand's Antarctica base Scott Base to mark the research base's 65th anniversary. The Government had already committed NZ$344 million to the redevelopment of Scott base. After Ardern's C-130 Hercules aircraft of the Royal New Zealand Air Force broke down, she and her entourage returned to Christchurch on an Italian C-130 Hercules aircraft.

In mid November 2022, Ardern attended the East Asia Summit in Cambodia where she condemned the Myanmar military regime's execution of political prisoners and called for consensus in response to the Russian invasion of Ukraine. During the East Asia Summit, she met with US President Biden to discuss New Zealand milk company A2 Milk's efforts to supply infant formula to help address the infant formula milk shortage in the United States.

On 30 November, Ardern hosted Finnish Prime Minister Sanna Marin, which marked the first visit by a Finnish head of government to New Zealand. During her visit, the two leaders discussed bilateral trade relations, the global economic situation, the Russian invasion of Ukraine, and human rights in Iran. During the ensuing press conference, Ardern rebuffed a suggestion by a journalist that the two heads of government had met because they were of a similar age and gender.

Resignation 

On 19 January 2023, at the Labour Party's summer caucus retreat, Ardern announced she would resign as Labour leader and prime minister by 7 February and leave Parliament by the 2023 general election. She cited a desire to spend more time with her partner and daughter and an inability to commit to another four years. Ardern had indicated in November 2022 that she would seek a third term as Prime Minister.
Speaking to the press during the caucus retreat as she announced her resignation plan, Ardern said, "I know what this job takes and I know that I no longer have enough in the tank to do it justice. It is that simple. We need a fresh set of shoulders for that challenge."

Ardern's announcement prompted reactions from across the New Zealand political establishment. The opposition National and ACT parties' leaders Christopher Luxon and David Seymour thanked Ardern for her service while expressing disagreement with her Government's policies. Green Party co-leader James Shaw credited Ardern with fostering a constructive working relationship between their parties while fellow co-leader Marama Davidson praised Ardern for her compassion and determination to promote a "fairer and safer" Aotearoa. Similar sentiments were echoed by the Māori Party's co-leaders Debbie Ngarewa-Packer and Rawiri Waititi, who praised her leadership qualities and contributions to New Zealand society. New Zealand First leader and former Deputy Prime Minister Winston Peters attributed Ardern's resignation to her government's failure to deliver on promises and targets during the 2020–2023 parliamentary term.

Prominent New Zealanders, including actor Sam Neill, comedian and writer Michèle A'Court, and Internet entrepreneur Kim Dotcom, expressed gratitude for Ardern's service. Overseas, Australian Prime Minister Anthony Albanese and several state leaders paid tribute to Ardern.

In several opinion polls, Ardern's domestic popularity had reached all-time lows in the past few months, although she denied this would affect the Labour Party's chances of winning the next election.

Ardern's final event as Prime Minister was a birthday celebration for Tahupōtiki Wiremu Rātana, a Māori prophet. At the event, Ardern called her work as the Prime Minister the "greatest privilege" and stated that she loved the country and its people. On 25 January, she was succeeded as prime minister and leader of the New Zealand Labour Party by Chris Hipkins; who had been elected unopposed during the 2023 New Zealand Labour Party leadership election.

Political views 

Ardern has described herself as a social democrat, a progressive, a republican, and a feminist, citing Helen Clark as a political hero. She has described the extent of child poverty and homelessness in New Zealand as a "blatant failure" of capitalism. Asked by reporters to comment on the 2021 Budget, Ardern stated to "have always described myself as a Democratic Socialist", but she does not consider the term to be useful in New Zealand, as it is not commonly used in the political sphere. The leftist magazine Jacobin asserts that, despite identifying as socialist, her government is effectively neoliberal. Referring to New Zealand's distinctive nuclear-free policy, she described taking action on climate change as "my generation's nuclear-free moment".

Ardern has spoken in support of same-sex marriage, and she voted for the Marriage (Definition of Marriage) Amendment Act 2013 which legalised it. In 2018, she became the first New Zealand prime minister to march in a pride parade. Ardern supported the removal of abortion from the Crimes Act 1961. In March 2020, she voted for the Abortion Legislation Act that amends the law to decriminalise abortion.

Ardern voted in favour of legalising cannabis in the 2020 New Zealand cannabis referendum, though she refused to reveal her position on decriminalisation until after the referendum had concluded.

With regard to the future of the Māori electorates—a contentious topic in New Zealand politics—Ardern believes the retention or abolition of the electorates (seats) should be decided by Māori, stating, "[Māori] have not raised the need for those seats to go, so why would we ask the question?" She supports compulsory study of the Māori language in schools.

In September 2017, Ardern said she wanted New Zealand to debate removing the monarch of New Zealand as head of state. During her announcement on 24 May 2021 of the appointment of Dame Cindy Kiro as the next Governor-General of New Zealand, Ardern said she believed that New Zealand would become a republic within her lifetime. She has, however, met regularly with members of the Royal Family over the years and said that, "My particular views do not change the respect that I have for Her Majesty and for her family and for the work that they've done for New Zealand. I think you can hold both views, and I do." Following the death of Queen Elizabeth II, Ardern reaffirmed her support for republicanism but stated that official moves towards New Zealand becoming a republic was not "on the agenda anytime soon."

Ardern advocates a lower rate of immigration, suggesting a drop of around 20,000–30,000. Calling it an "infrastructure issue", she argues that "there hasn't been enough planning about population growth, we haven't necessarily targeted our skill shortages properly"; however, she wants to increase the intake of refugees.

In foreign affairs, Ardern has voiced support for a two-state solution to resolve the Israeli–Palestinian conflict. She condemned the Israeli killing of Palestinians during protests at the Gaza border.

Following the Supreme Court's landmark Make It 16 Incorporated v Attorney-General ruling in November 2022, Ardern has voiced support for lowering the voting age to 16 years. She announced that the Government would introduce legislation lowering the voting age to 16 years; with such legislation requiring a 75 per cent majority.

Public image 

Ardern has often been described as a celebrity politician. After becoming the Labour Party leader, Ardern received positive coverage from many sections of the media, including international outlets such as CNN, with commentators referring to a "Jacinda effect" and "Jacindamania".

Jacindamania was cited as a factor behind New Zealand gaining global attention and media influence in some reports, including the Soft Power 30 index. In a 2018 overseas trip, Ardern attracted much attention from international media, particularly after delivering a speech at the United Nations in New York. She contrasted with contemporary world leaders, being cast as an "antidote to Trumpism". Writing for Stuff, Tracy Watkins said Ardern made a "cut-through on the world stage" and her reception was as a "torch carrier for progressive politics as a young woman who breaks the mold in a world where the political strongman is on the rise. She is a foil to the muscular diplomacy of the likes of US President Donald Trump and Russian President Vladimir Putin."

A year after Ardern formed her government, The Guardian's Eleanor Ainge Roy reported that Jacindamania was waning in the population, with not enough of the promised change visible. When Toby Manhire, the editor of The Spinoff, reviewed the decade in December 2019, he praised Ardern for her leadership following the Christchurch mosque shootings and the Whakaari / White Island eruption, saying that "Ardern ... revealed an empathy, steel and clarity that in the most appalling circumstances brought New Zealanders together and inspired people the world over. It was a strength of character that showed itself again this week following the tragic eruption at Whakaari."

Honours
Ardern was one of fifteen women selected to appear on the cover of the September 2019 issue of British Vogue, by guest editor Meghan, Duchess of Sussex. Forbes magazine has consistently ranked her among the 100 most powerful women in the world, placing her 34th in 2021. She was included in the 2019 Time 100 list and shortlisted for Time'''s 2019 Person of the Year. The magazine later incorrectly speculated that she might win the 2019 Nobel Peace Prize among a listed six candidates, for her handling of the Christchurch mosque shootings. In 2020, she was listed by Prospect as the second-greatest thinker for the COVID-19 era. On 19 November 2020, Ardern was awarded Harvard University's 2020 Gleitsman International Activist Award; she contributed the US$150,000 (NZ$216,000) prize money to New Zealanders studying at the university.

In 2021, New Zealand zoologist Steven A. Trewick named the flightless wētā species Hemiandrus jacinda in honour of Ardern. A spokesperson for Ardern said that a beetle (Mecodema jacinda), a lichen (Ocellularia jacinda-arderniae), and an ant (Crematogaster jacindae'', found in Saudi Arabia) had also been named after her.

In mid-May 2021, Fortune magazine gave Ardern the top spot on their list of world's 50 greatest leaders, citing her leadership during the COVID-19 pandemic as well as her handling of the Christchurch mosque shootings and the 2019 Whakaari / White Island eruption.

On 26 May 2022, Ardern was awarded an honorary Doctor of Laws degree by Harvard University for contributions that "shape the world".

Personal life

Religious views 
Raised as a member of The Church of Jesus Christ of Latter-day Saints in New Zealand, Ardern left the church in 2005 at age 25 because, she said, it conflicted with her personal views, in particular her support for gay rights. In January 2017, Ardern identified as agnostic, saying "I can't see myself being a member of an organised religion again". As prime minister in 2019 she met the president of LDS Church, Russell M. Nelson.

Family

Ardern is a second cousin of Hamish McDouall, former mayor of Whanganui. She is also a distant cousin of former National MP for Taranaki-King Country Shane Ardern. Shane Ardern left Parliament in 2014, three years before Jacinda Ardern became prime minister.

Ardern's partner is television presenter Clarke Gayford. The couple first met in 2012 when they were introduced by mutual friend Colin Mathura-Jeffree, a New Zealand television host and model, but they did not spend time together until Gayford contacted Ardern regarding a controversial Government Communications Security Bureau bill. On 3 May 2019, it was reported that Ardern was engaged to marry Gayford. The wedding was scheduled for January 2022 but has been delayed due to an outbreak of the SARS-CoV-2 Omicron variant.

On 19 January 2018, Ardern announced that she was expecting her first child in June, making her New Zealand's first prime minister to be pregnant in office. Ardern was admitted to Auckland City Hospital on 21 June 2018, and gave birth to a girl the same day, becoming only the second elected head of government to give birth while in office (after Benazir Bhutto in 1990). Her daughter's given names are Neve Te Aroha. Neve is an anglicised form of the Irish name Niamh, meaning 'bright';  is Māori for 'love', and Te Aroha is a rural town west of the Kaimai Range, near Ardern's former home town of Morrinsville.

See also 
 List of New Zealand governments
 Politics of New Zealand
 Paddles (cat), Ardern's former pet cat

References

External links 

 Jacinda Ardern's profile on the New Zealand Parliament website
 Jacinda Ardern at the New Zealand Labour Party
 

 

 

 

 

 

 

 

 
1980 births
Living people
21st-century New Zealand politicians
21st-century New Zealand women politicians
Candidates in the 2017 New Zealand general election
Candidates in the 2020 New Zealand general election
Female heads of government in New Zealand
Former Latter Day Saints
Gun politics in New Zealand
Leaders of the Opposition (New Zealand)
Members of the New Zealand House of Representatives
New Zealand agnostics
New Zealand feminists
New Zealand former Christians
New Zealand Labour Party leaders
New Zealand Labour Party MPs
New Zealand list MPs
New Zealand MPs for Auckland electorates
New Zealand republicans
People from Hamilton, New Zealand
People from Morrinsville
People from Murupara
Prime Ministers of New Zealand
New Zealand socialist feminists
University of Waikato alumni
Women government ministers of New Zealand
Women members of the New Zealand House of Representatives
Women opposition leaders
Women prime ministers
World Economic Forum Young Global Leaders
New Zealand people of English descent
New Zealand people of Scottish descent
Women deputy opposition leaders
People educated at Morrinsville College